Kennystown may refer to:

Kennystown, County Tyrone, a townland in County Tyrone, Northern Ireland
Kennystown, County Wicklow, a townland in County Wicklow, Ireland